Gregorios or Gregorius may refer to:

People
 Gregorios Abdal Jaleel (died 1681), bishop and saint of the Syriac Orthodox Church
 Gregorios Bernardakis (1848–1925), Greek philologist, palaeographer and professor
 Gregorios Yohanna Ibrahim (born 1948), Syriac Orthodox archbishop of Aleppo and kidnap victim
 Gregorios Joseph (born 1960), Syriac Orthodox bishop
 Gregorios Kuriakose (born 1954), Syriac Orthodox bishop
 Gregorius Nekschot, pseudonym of an anonymous and prosecuted Dutch cartoonist
 Gregorios Papamichael (1875–1956), theologian of the Orthodox Church of Greece
 Benedict Gregorios (1916–1994), second Metropolitan Archbishop of the Syro-Malankara Catholic Church
 Gabriel Mar Gregorios (born 1949), Metropolitan of the Diocese of Thiruvananthapuram of the Indian (Malankara) Orthodox Church
 Geevarghese Gregorios of Parumala (1848–1902), bishop and saint of the Malankara Syrian Church and saint of the Syriac Orthodox Church
 Paulos Gregorios (1922–1996), first Metropolitan of the Delhi diocese of the Malankara Orthodox Syrian Church

Fictional characters
 Sergeant Gregorius, in Dan Simmons's novels Endymion and The Rise of Endymion
 Reverend Gregorius, the antagonist in Hjalmar Söderberg's novel Doctor Glas

Masculine given names